Ana E. Cucurella Adorno is a Puerto Rican academic administrator serving as the president of Caribbean University. She helped the university establish the Puerto Rico's first Ph.D. program in curriculum.

References 

Living people
Year of birth missing (living people)
Place of birth missing (living people)
Women heads of universities and colleges
Heads of universities and colleges in the United States
21st-century Puerto Rican women
Puerto Rican academics